Krishnath College School, is one of the oldest schools in Bengal situated in Baharampur, Murshidabad district in India. Originally located in the same building as Krishnath College, it was moved into separate buildings in 1908.

History 
The original School had no separate entrance and was part of Krishna College. Regular classes were started on the 21st of November, 1853. In 1855, the School was shifted to Mr. Verdon Monasagon's two-story house. In the year 1857, the School was again shifted to Banjetia House of Maharani Swarnamoyee. When the Krishnath College Building was completed, the School was shifted to the eastern block of said building. In 1887, Maharani Swarnamoyee undertook the administrative and financial control of the College as well as the School. In 1902, the name of the School was changed to Krishnath College School. On 9 August 1909, the foundation stone was laid by Hon’ble Sir Edward Norman Baker, the Lieutenant-Governor of Bengal. The school was shifted to its present imposing building, built with the help of Maharaja Manindra Chandra Nandy. In August 1911, the school was formally opened by Lord Fraser William Duke, the Officiating Governor of Bangal.

Social activities 

The Boy Scout movement was introduced in the school in 1921. The Boy Scouts of America (BSA) Troop of the school rendered admirable service in Monghyr after the devastation brought about by the Behar earthquake. In 1949–50, the school took grant-in-aid, as they had a deficit. A Junior Division, 62nd Troop, of the National Cadet Corps (NCC) was started in the school on 31 January 1952. The system of midday tiffin, as outlined by the Board of Secondary Education has been introduced in Class V to VI for one year as an experimental measure. The school also took an active role in the propagation of the National Language.

Others 

The school has a rich history in contribution to both the practice of medicine and sports, having an unquestioned supremacy in the latter. Four graduates of this school have chosen to serve the cause of national defense. Krishnath College school became a sponsored school on the 19th of January 1989.

Rakhaldas Bandyopadhyay was an Indian archaeologist and museum expert, formerly studied at the school.

Many students of this school secure state board ranks in Madhyamik and higher secondary exams.

Many students of the school secure a position in the National Children's Science Congress, a scientific communications project program for children, organized by the Department of Sciences and Technology. They secure district, state and also national level rankings. In 2017, the school came 11th on a  national level under the guidance of teacher Abhijit Bhattacharya.

References

Schools in Murshidabad district
High schools and secondary schools in West Bengal
Educational institutions established in 1853
1853 establishments in India